Mount Nivea is a conspicuous, snow-topped mountain, 1,265 m, at the head of Sunshine Glacier on Coronation Island, in the South Orkney Islands. A number of rock towers lie on the northwest side. Surveyed by the Falkland Islands Dependencies Survey (FIDS) in 1948–49, and named by them for the snow petrel (Pagodroma nivea) which breeds in this area.

Mountains of the South Orkney Islands